Chen Xiaojiang (born June 1962) is a Chinese editor and politician who is the Executive Deputy Head of the United Front Work Department of the Central Committee of the Chinese Communist Party since 2022. Previously, he served as Minister of the National Ethnic Affairs Commission; deputy director of the National Supervisory Commission, the highest anti-corruption agency of China; and deputy secretary of the Central Commission for Discipline Inspection, the party's internal disciplinary body.

Early life and education
Chen was born in Longyou County, Zhejiang, in June 1962. In 1980, he entered Wuhan Institute of Hydraulic and Electric Engineering (now Wuhan University), majoring in power system and its automation at the Department of Electrical Engineering, where he graduated in 1984.

Editorial career
He worked at the China Electric Power News for a short while before joining the China Water Resources and Electric Power News in 1986. He was promoted to chief editor in 1993 and president in 1996, respectively.

Political career
Chen began his career in the Ministry of Water Resources in 1998, what he was appointed director-general of the General Office in April 2008 and then director of the Yellow River Conservancy Commission in March 2011.

In August 2015, he became head of the Publicity Department of Central Commission for Discipline Inspection (CCDI), but having held the position for only seven months.

In May 2016, he was transferred to northeast China's Liaoning province, where he was secretary of the Liaoning Provincial Commission for Discipline Inspection, the party's agency in charge of anti-corruption efforts. And he was admitted to member of the standing committee of the CPC Liaoning Provincial Committee, the province's top authority.

In May 2017, he was recalled to Beijing and appointed deputy director of the Ministry of Supervision, the then highest anti-corruption agency of China. On 25 October 2017, he became deputy secretary of the CCDI, a position at ministerial level. On 11 March 2018, he concurrently served as deputy director of the newly founded National Supervisory Commission.

On 24 December 2020, he was appointed minister of the State Ethnic Affairs Commission and the National People's Congress confirmed the appointment on December 26. Chen is the second Han Chinese minister since the ministry was established in 1949, after Li Weihan. He also serves as deputy head of the United Front Work Department.

References

1962 births
Living people
People from Longyou County
Wuhan University alumni
People's Republic of China politicians from Zhejiang
Chinese Communist Party politicians from Zhejiang
Members of the 20th Central Committee of the Chinese Communist Party